The Yakataga Formation is a geologic formation in Alaska. It preserves fossils dating back to the Neogene period.

See also

 List of fossiliferous stratigraphic units in Alaska
 Paleontology in Alaska

References

Further reading
George Plafker and W.O. Addicott, Glaciomarine deposits of Miocene through Holocene age in the Yakataga Formation along the Gulf of Alaska margin, Alaska. (USGS Publications, 1976)
Noel P. James, Carolyn H. Eyles, Nicholas Eyles, Eric E. Hiatt and T. Kurtis Kyser, Carbonates within a Pleistocene glaciomarine succession, Yakataga Formation, Middleton Island, Alaska. Sedimentology (2009) 56, 367–397. doi: 10.1111/j.1365-3091.2008.00973.x

Neogene Alaska